Oedipina uniformis is a species of salamander in the family Plethodontidae. It is found in mountains and lowlands of central Costa Rica to the Panamian border and likely to occur in Panama.

Oedipina uniformis inhabits humid premontane and lower montane forests where it lives in leaf-litter, under decaying logs, and in moss banks. It can, however, withstand significant habitat modification, and has also been found in pastures, gardens and even cities.

It is generally not threatened by habitat loss.

References

uniformis
Amphibians of Costa Rica
Endemic fauna of Costa Rica
Taxa named by Wilhelm Moritz Keferstein
Amphibians described in 1868
Taxonomy articles created by Polbot